The Robinson-Parsons Farm is a historic farmhouse on Town Farm Brook Road in Paris, Maine.  This house, a well-preserved Federal style structure whose oldest portion dates to c. 1795, was built by Stephen Robinson, one of the earliest white settlers of the area, and has remained in the hands of his descendants.  It is regionally distinctive for its brick side walls, a feature not normally found in rural Maine. It was listed on the National Register of Historic Places in 1982.

Description and history
Stephen Robinson, one of the early white settlers of this part of Paris, acquired the land this house stands on in 1788.  Around 1795 he built a two-story wood frame gable-roofed structure, which now serves as the rear ell of the main house.  The birth of five daughters prompted the construction of the larger main block, which was completed in 1803.  Robinson raised eleven children in the house, and one of his daughters married John Parsons of nearby Norway.  This couple inherited the house, and it has since remained in the hands of their descendants.

The main block of the house is a -story wood-frame structure, five bays wide, with a side gable roof and four side chimneys in the brick end walls.  The main entrance, centered on the east-facing facade, is topped by a fanlight window and flanked by pilasters of Doric order, which support a lintel with entablature.  There are secondary entrances on the side walls.  The rear ell joins the house to a barn.  The upstairs of the main block features a distinctive hinged wall, enabling the space to be converted into a sizable ballroom for entertainment.

See also
National Register of Historic Places listings in Oxford County, Maine

References

Houses on the National Register of Historic Places in Maine
Federal architecture in Maine
Houses completed in 1795
Houses in Oxford County, Maine
Paris, Maine
National Register of Historic Places in Oxford County, Maine